Zuism is an Icelandic group established in the 2010s to be a modern Pagan new religious movement based on the Sumerian religion.

After registering as a religious group in 2013 with three members, the group experienced significant surge in membership in 2015, under new management, when it announced that the government church funds to the Zuist Church would be reimbursed to every member. At its peak, the Church had around 3000 members. In the late 2010s, the Church underwent a significant decline after facing a number of legal troubles, including being prosecuted for fraud.

History
The Zuist Church of Iceland was founded in 2010. Zuism became a government-recognised religion in Iceland in 2013 when Icelandic law was amended to allow further non-Christian religions to be registered with the state. The Zuist Church was founded years before, in 2010, by Ólafur Helgi Þorgrímsson, who left it shortly after it became government recognised. The group initially had three members with Ólafur Helgi Grímsson as the director and brothers Ágúst Arnar Ágústsson and Einar Ágústsson as board members. In 2015 the District Commissioner of northeast Iceland requested that the leaders or directors of the Zuist Church would come forward as the group had no members and no real activity in the years preceding.

In late 2015 the Board of Directors of the Zuist Church of Iceland was hijacked by people who were originally unrelated to the movement. Under the new leader Ísak Andri Ólafsson, Zuism became a medium for a protest against the major government-supported churches and against the levying of a tax on all taxpayers, payable to their religion if they had registered one; after the protest started over 3,000 members joined in a short period at the end of 2015. Iceland requires taxpayers to identify with one of the religions recognised by the state, or with a non-recognised religion or no religion; a tax (of about US$80, £50 in 2015) is paid to the relevant religion, if recognised, but will run directly to the government if a religion is not stated. Zuism, unlike other religions, promised to refund the money back to its members that it receives from the tax.

Ágúst Arnar Ágústsson and the new board led by Ísak Andri Ólafsson started a judicial dispute over the leadership of the organisation. Ágúst Arnar Ágústsson was ultimately reinstated as the leader of the movement in 2016, and, by October 2017, after two years of frozen activity, the case was closed allowing the church to dispose of its charges and refund its members. In 2018 Ágúst Arnar said that the church needed housing as it had accumulated thousands of members in the last two to three years. In May of 2018, the Church applied to the Reykjavik City Council for a lot. With their request was a plan to build a ziggurat temple in Reykjavik. In June their request was denied. 

In early 2019, the Icelandic government suspended parish tax payments to the Church, citing a lack of disclosure from the Church on how the money was being spent, despite Icelandic law requiring such disclosure. In response, the Zuist Church announced that it would be suing the government. In December 2019, Ágústsson announced his intention to dissolve the organisation, stating that he was tired of fighting legal battles.

In 2020, the Icelandic government launched a formal investigation into the group's activities. Later that year, the group was charged with fraud and money laundering after setting up shell companies to funnel the government funds that the church was receiving, to the founders. The founders had previously received sentences for various scams. In April 2022, they were acquitted on all charges.  It is unknown if they will continue to run Zuism, although Ágúst had previously said that he was going to discontinue Zuism altogether as he was tired of fighting legal battles.

In 2021, the Zuist Church saw the largest decrease in membership among all religious organisations in Iceland. In March of 2021 the group still had 795 registered members.

See also
 Neopaganism
 Religion in Iceland

References

External links
 Zuist Church in Iceland 
 Zuist Church, international website 

New religious movements
Modern paganism in Iceland
Tax avoidance
Protests in Iceland
2015 protests
Religion and government
Sumer
Modern pagan organizations established in the 2010s
Religious organizations established in 2010
2010 establishments in Iceland